Creech is an unincorporated community in Harlan County, Kentucky, United States. In 1907, the Creech post office opened, closing at an unknown date.

References

Unincorporated communities in Harlan County, Kentucky
Unincorporated communities in Kentucky